RFA Rowanol (A284) was a coastal tanker of the Royal Fleet Auxiliary.

Laid down on 27 September 1945, and launched on 15 May 1946 as Ebonol, she was the second ship to bear this name. Commissioned on 21 August 1946 as Cedarol, and renamed Rowanol on 18 September 1947. The ship was decommissioned on 3 December 1970 and laid up at Devonport. She arrived in tow at Zeebrugge for scrapping on 10 December 1971.

References

Ships of the Royal Fleet Auxiliary
1946 ships